Olympian or Olympians may refer to:

Religion
 Twelve Olympians, the principal gods and goddesses in ancient Greek religion
 Olympian spirits, spirits mentioned in books of ceremonial magic

Fiction
 Percy Jackson & the Olympians, fiction series by Rick Riordan
 Olympian (comics), name of two fictional characters in DC Comics
 Olympian Gods (DC Comics), group of characters based on ancient Greek religion
 Olympians (Marvel Comics), group of characters based on ancient Greek religion
 The Olympian (novel), by James Oppenheim

Sports
 Olympic Games participants
 Beijing Olympians, a Chinese professional men's basketball team
 Indianapolis Olympians, NBA team in Indianapolis, Indiana, 1949–1953
 London Olympians, a British amateur American football team
 SoCal Olympians, an organization of the United States Olympic team
 World Olympians Association, an association of former Olympic athletes

Transportation
 Olympian (automobile), built by the Olympian Motors Company, 1917–21
 Olympian (sidewheeler), a steamboat, 1884–1890
 Olympian Hiawatha, a passenger train
 Leyland-MCW Olympian, a single deck bus 
 Leyland Olympian, a double decker bus
 Volvo Olympian, a double decker bus built by Volvo, 1992–2000

Other uses
 Olympia, Greece, denizens of this city
 Olympia, Washington, denizens of this city
 Olympian (album), by British rock band Gene
 Olympian City, a shopping and residential complex in Tai Kok Tsui, Kowloon, Hong Kong
 Olympian High School, a public high school in San Diego County, California
 Olympian Publishing, a publishing house with offices in Chicago
 The Olympian, a newspaper in Olympia, Washington
 The Olympians, an opera by Arthur Bliss

See also
 Olympus (disambiguation)